Oseberg Øst is an offshore oil field in the North Sea, located east of Oseberg Oil Field. The field was developed with a fixed production, drilling and quarters (PDQ) facility and is operated by Statoil. The first stage phase processing is done at the Oseberg Øst platform. The second and third phase processing of oil is done at the Oseberg Field Center and it is then transported to Sture terminal in Norway through the Oseberg Transport System.

Technical features
The trap consists of two fault blocks, separated by a sealing fault. Recovery is done through pressure maintenance utilizing both water injection and water alternating gas injection.

Updates
In the recent years, the facility has been modified and drilling of seven wells started. Partners developing the field invested NOK1.9 billion for upgrades and modifications in order to extract more oil from the field without the use of support vessels and increase the recovery rate from 28 to 35%. The upgrades included new drilling fluid module with appurtenant generator and transformer, new process control for zero discharges of drilling waste and pollutant liquids, 20 new cabins, 2 new lifeboats with room for 62 persons, new loading deck for drilling equipment and drilling chemicals.

See also

Oseberg Oil Field
Oseberg Sør
Sture terminal
Oseberg Transport System
Grane oil field
Grane oil pipeline
North Sea oil

References

External links
Statoil website
Map of Oseberg field from OLJEDIREKTORATET Norwegian Petroleum Directorate

Oil fields in Norway
North Sea energy
Equinor oil and gas fields
TotalEnergies
ConocoPhillips oil and gas fields